Elections for the London Borough of Merton were held on 7 May 1998 to elect members of Merton London Borough Council in London, England. This was on the same day as other local elections in England and a referendum on the Greater London Authority; in the latter, Merton voted in favour of creating the Greater London Authority by 72.2% on a 37.6% turnout.

The whole council was up for election and the Labour Party stayed in overall control of the council, despite losing one seat.

There were some minor ward boundary changes which came into effect in December 1994; these affected Merton's boundaries with Sutton and Croydon. However, the number of council seats remained at fifty-seven. This would be the last election under these boundaries: in 2002, the number of seats was increased by 3 and all ward boundaries were redrawn.

Results
The incumbent Labour majority administration lost two seats to the Conservatives and gained one seat from Longthornton and Tamworth Residents Association, whose last councillor was elected in 1994 and no longer sat for the party; the party did not contest the election.

Merton Park Ward Residents Association and the Liberal Democrats maintained their three seats each in Merton Park and West Barnes respectively.

Ward results

References

1998 London Borough council elections
Council elections in the London Borough of Merton